Wickham Park is a park at 330 Wickham Terrace, Spring Hill, Brisbane, Queensland, Australia.

Geography
Wickham Park lies on the fall of the land from Wickham Terrace to down to Albert Street. To the north-west, it is adjacent to the Roma Street Parkland (formerly Albert Park) which lies on the fall of the land from the higher parts of Wickham Terrace down to the Roma Street railway station.

History

Wickham Park was named after John Clements Wickham. It was formerly known as the Wickham Terrace Reserve and Wickham Terrace Park.

Heritage listings

Wickham Park contains a number of heritage-listed sites, including:
 226 Wickham Terrace: The Old Windmill, the oldest surviving building in Brisbane
 230 Wickham Terrace: Spring Hill Reservoirs
 330 Wickham Terrace: Wickham Park Air Raid Shelters

References

External links

  — Description of the park in 1886

Parks in Brisbane
History of Brisbane
Spring Hill, Queensland